Blerim Reka is an ethnic Albanian academic from North Macedonia. He is currently the Minister of European Integration of Kosovo. He ran as an independent presidential candidate in the 2019 North Macedonian presidential election.

Biography
Blerim H. Reka was born in 1960 in Skopje, at the time in FPR Yugoslavia, where he went to school. Later Reka graduated in law from the University of Prishtina.

Reka was Ambassador of the Republic of Macedonia to the European Union in Brussels. Reka has also held diplomatic and legal advisory positions such as Advisor to the President of the Republic of Kosovo for EU Integration. Reka was the Legal Council of the Government of the Republic of Macedonia and Member of the Expert Team for National Strategy and Integration to the EU. Reka has been professor of International Law, International Relations and EU Law at South East European University since 2002. Dr. Reka holds a doctorate in International Public Law and Civil and Economic Law. Reka is an author of 18 books.

On March 5th 2019, his campaign announced he had collected the necessary signatures to become an independent presidential candidate for the 2019 election. Reka's candidacy was backed by the Albanian opposition. According to a statement issued by the Alliance for Albanians and BESA parties, Reka's candidacy was supported by over 11,000 citizens.

On 3 February 2020, Reka was named as the Minister of European Integration of Kosovo in the government of Albin Kurti.

References 

1963 births
Living people
Candidates for President of North Macedonia
Politicians from Skopje
Albanians in North Macedonia
Government ministers of Kosovo
Academic staff of South East European University